Jess Conrad  (born Gerald Arthur James; 24 February 1936) is an English stage and screen actor and singer. As a boy he was nicknamed "Jesse" after American outlaw Jesse James; as there was already an actor named "Gerald James" in Actors' Equity, a drama teacher who was a fan of writer Joseph Conrad suggested the stage name of "Jess Conrad".

Biography
Conrad was born in Brixton, South London and started his career as a repertory actor and film extra, before being cast in a television play, Bye, Bye Barney, as a pop singer. He was noticed by Jack Good, who included him in his TV series Oh Boy!. Conrad then was signed to Decca Records and had a number of chart hits, including "Cherry Pie", "This Pullover", "Mystery Girl" and "Pretty Jenny"; also recording for Columbia, Pye President and EMI.

Between the late 1950s and mid-1960s, Conrad appeared in a number of films such as Serious Charge (uncredited), The Boys, Rag Doll, (filmed in 1960, and released in 1961); K.I.L. 1 and Konga as well as Michael Powell's The Queen's Guards. Conrad played Danny Pace in an episode of The Human Jungle called "The Flip Side Man" in 1963.

During the 1970s, he spent some time in the stage shows Godspell and Joseph and the Amazing Technicolor Dreamcoat, and also featured in a cameo role in the Sex Pistols film The Great Rock 'n' Roll Swindle. In 1977 no fewer than seven of Conrad's singles were included in the 'World's Worst Record' list, chosen by listeners to Capital FM DJ Kenny Everett's show, and "This Pullover", voted sixth worst song ever, later featured on The World's Worst Record Show, a 1978 LP dedicated to the songs voted for, together with two other Conrad recordings "Cherry Pie" and "Why Am I Living?" He also made an appearance in Are You Being Served as Mr Walpole, head of sporting equipment, in the episode "Memories Are Made of This".

Conrad also appeared in the 1984 TV series of Miss Marple, in the episode entitled The Body in the Library as Raymond Starr. He also starred in the 1993 film The Punk and the Princess.

In the 1990s, Conrad made regular cameo appearances on Jim Davidson's revived version of The Generation Game on BBC1. In 1992, Conrad appeared in the Christmas Special of Big Break, also presented by Davidson and John Virgo. He was the "booby" prize of the show presented to actress Ruth Madoc. Contestants who failed to make the final of Big Break were often nearly given a box set of Conrad's hit singles.

Since then, Conrad has appeared in a number of documentaries and television programmes, often offering stories of violent encounters with other famous people. In a BBC Arena documentary about the record producer Joe Meek, Conrad boasted of biting off part of the nose of the singer Heinz during a confrontation backstage at a package show in the early 1960s. Similarly, in Sex, Secrets & Frankie Howerd, he told of threatening to cut off comedian Frankie Howerd's ears when Howerd made undesired sexual advances to him in a dressing room. In 2005, Conrad had a guest role in the sitcom Last of the Summer Wine.

In the 2009 film Telstar: The Joe Meek Story, Conrad is played by Nigel Harman. Conrad himself appears in one scene, depicting his backstage fight with Heinz and his biting of Heinz's nose. Conrad also plays the role of Larry Parnes in the film. In October 2022, he appeared in the BBC soap opera Doctors as Alan Yates.

Awards
Conrad is a member of the show business fraternity the Grand Order of Water Rats, having served as "King Rat". He is also a Freemason and a member of Chelsea Lodge No. 3098, the membership of which is made up of entertainers. He was appointed an Officer of the Order of the British Empire (OBE) in the 2011 Queen's Birthday Honours for charitable services. In 2018, he appeared in ITV's Last Laugh in Vegas.

Personal life
Conrad is married to Renee and has two daughters, Sasha and Natalie. He described the actress Diana Dors as "the best friend I ever had".

Selected discography
"Cherry Pie" / "There's Gonna Be A Day" 1960
"Out of Luck" / "Unless You Mean It" Decca UK	 1960
"Mystery Girl" A2: Just The Two of Us B1: (I Wanna) Love My Life Away B2: Maybe You'll Be There 1961	EP
"Mystery Girl" / "The Big White House"  1961	
"This Pullover" / "Why Am I Living"  1961	
"I See You" / "Oh! You Beautiful Doll"  1961	
"Every Breath I Take" / "Walk Away"  1961
"Twist My Wrist" / "Hey Little Girl"    1961

Filmography

Film

Television

References

External links
Jess Conrad discography

Official Conrad website

1936 births
Living people
English pop singers
Freemasons of the United Grand Lodge of England
Officers of the Order of the British Empire
English male singers
English male film actors
People from Brixton
Singers from London
Male actors from London
20th-century English singers
20th-century English male actors
21st-century English singers
21st-century English male actors
20th-century British male singers
21st-century British male singers